The flag of Ireland, frequently referred to in Ireland as 'the tricolour' and elsewhere as the Irish tricolour is a vertical tricolour of green (at the hoist), white and orange. The proportions of the flag are 1:2 (that is to say, flown horizontally, the flag is half as high as it is wide).

Presented as a gift in 1848 to Thomas Francis Meagher from a small group of French women sympathetic to Irish nationalism, it was intended to symbolise the inclusion and hoped-for union between Roman Catholics (symbolised by the green colour) and Protestants (symbolised by the orange colour). The significance of the colours outlined by Meagher was, "The white in the centre signifies a lasting truce between Orange and Green and I trust that beneath its folds the hands of Irish Protestants and Irish Catholics may be clasped in generous and heroic brotherhood".

It was not until the Easter Rising of 1916, when it was raised above Dublin's General Post Office by Gearóid O'Sullivan, that the tricolour came to be regarded as the national flag. The flag was adopted by the Irish Republic during the Irish War of Independence (1919–1921). The flag's use was continued by the Irish Free State (1922–1937) and it was later given constitutional status under the 1937 Constitution of Ireland. The tricolour is used by nationalists on both sides of the border as the national flag of the whole island of Ireland since 1916. Thus it is flown by many nationalists in Northern Ireland as well as by the Gaelic Athletic Association.

Design and symbolism
In relation to the national flag of Ireland, the Constitution of Ireland simply states in Article 7:

As there are no further statutory requirements in relation to the flag, the Department of the Taoiseach takes general responsibility for matters relating to the flag. In its advisory role, the department has issued guidelines to assist persons in their use of the national flag. The flag should be rectangular in shape and its length should be two times its width, translating into an aspect ratio of 1:2. The three coloured pales – green, white and orange – should be of equal size, and vertically disposed.
The precise colours of the flag as set by the Department of the Taoiseach since at least 2001 are:
{| class=wikitable style="text-align:center;"
|-
! Scheme
!style="background:#169B62;color:white"| Green
!style="background:#FFFFFF"| White
!style="background:#FF883E;color:white"| Orange
!Sources
|-
| style="background:#F2F2F2; text-align:right" |Pantone || 347 U || Safe || 151 U
|
|-
| style="background:#F2F2F2; text-align:right" |Hex triplet|| #169B62 || #FFFFFF || #FF883E
|
|-
| style="background:#F2F2F2; text-align:right" | RGB
| 22–155–98 || 255–255–255 || 255–136–62
|
|-
| style="background:#F2F2F2; text-align:right" |CMYK
| 71–0–72–0 || 0–0–0–0 || 0–43–91–0
|
|}

The flag should normally be displayed on a flagstaff, with the green pale positioned next to the flagstaff, at the hoist. Provided that the correct proportions are observed, the flag may be made to any convenient size.

Symbolism
The green pale of the flag symbolises Roman Catholics, the orange represents the minority Protestants who were supporters of William of Orange. His title came from the Principality of Orange but his power from his leadership as Stadtholder of the Netherlands, a Protestant bastion from the 16th century. The white in the centre signifies a lasting peace and hope for union between Protestants and Catholics in Ireland. The flag, as a whole, is intended to symbolise the inclusion and hoped-for union of the people of different traditions on the island of Ireland, which is expressed in the Constitution as the entitlement of every person born in Ireland to be part of the independent Irish nation, regardless of ethnic origin, religion or political conviction. (Green was also used as the colour of such Irish bodies as the mainly-Protestant and nonsectarian Friendly Brothers of St. Patrick, established in 1751.)

Occasionally, differing shades of yellow, instead of orange, are seen at civilian functions. However the Department of the Taoiseach stated that is a misrepresentation that "should be actively discouraged" and that worn-out flags should be replaced. In songs and poems, the colours are sometimes enumerated as "green, white and gold" by using poetic licence. Variants of different guises are utilised to include, for example, various emblems of Ireland, such as the presidential harp, the four provinces or county arms.

History
A green flag featuring a harp is described as being used by Eoghan Ruadh Ó Néill in 1642.

The colour green became associated with Ireland from the 1640s, when the green harp flag was used by the Irish Catholic Confederation. Likewise Green ribbons have been worn on St Patrick's Day since at least the 1680s. suggesting that green was already a national colour at this time, The Friendly Brothers of St Patrick, an Irish nationalistic fraternity founded in about 1750 adopted green as its colour. Green was for centuries associated with rebellion and was the unofficial colour of Ireland. In the late 18th century green had again become associated as the colour of nationalism. The United Irishmen, founded in the 1790s, were inspired by the French revolution, and used a green flag, to which they had a harp emblazoned. A rival organisation, the Orange Order, whose main strength was in Ulster, and which was exclusively for Protestants, especially members of the Anglican Church of Ireland, was founded in 1795 in memory of King William of Orange and the Glorious Revolution of 1688. Following the Irish Rebellion of 1798, which pitted the "green" tradition of the republican United Irishmen against the "orange" tradition of Anglican Protestant Ascendancy loyal to the British Crown, the ideal of a later nationalist generation in the mid-19th century was to make peace between the two traditions and, if possible, to found a self-governing Ireland on such peace and union.

The oldest known reference to the use of the three colours of green, white and orange as a nationalist emblem dates from September 1830 when tricolour cockades were worn at a meeting held to celebrate the French Revolution of that year – a revolution which restored the use of the French tricolour. The colours were also used in the same period for rosettes and badges, and on the banners of trade guilds. However, widespread recognition was not accorded to the flag until 1848. At a meeting in his native city of Waterford on 7 March 1848, Thomas Francis Meagher, the Young Ireland leader, first publicly unveiled the flag from a second-floor window of the Wolfe Tone Club as he addressed a gathered crowd on the street below who were present to celebrate another revolution that had just taken place in France. It was inspired by the tricolour of France. Speeches made at that time by Meagher suggest that it was regarded as an innovation and not as the revival of an older flag. From March of that year Irish tricolours appeared side by side with French ones at meetings held all over the country. John Mitchel, referring to the tricolour of green, white and orange that Meagher had presented from Paris at a later meeting in Dublin on 15 April 1848, said: "I hope to see that flag one day waving, as our national banner".

Although the tricolour was not forgotten as a symbol of the ideal of union and a banner associated with the Young Irelanders and revolution, it was rarely used between 1848 and 1916. Even up to the eve of the Easter Rising of 1916, the green flag featuring a harp held undisputed sway. Neither the colours nor the arrangement of the early tricolours were standardised. All of the 1848 tricolours showed green, white and orange, but orange was sometimes put next to the staff, and in at least one flag the order was orange, green and white. In 1850 a flag of green for the Roman Catholics, orange for the Protestants of the Established Church and blue for the Presbyterians was proposed. In 1883, a Parnellite tricolour of yellow, white and green, arranged horizontally, was recorded. Down to modern times, yellow has occasionally been used instead of orange, but by this substitution the fundamental symbolism is destroyed.

Associated with separatism in the past, flown during the Easter Rising of 1916 and capturing the national imagination as the banner of the new revolutionary Ireland, the tricolour came to be acclaimed throughout the country as somewhat of a national flag. To many Irish people, though, it was considered to be a "Sinn Féin flag".

In the Irish Free State which existed between 1922 and 1937, the flag was adopted by the Executive Council. The Free State constitution did not specify national symbols; the decision to use the flag was made without recourse to statute. When the Free State joined the League of Nations in September 1923, the new flag "created a good deal of interest amongst the general public" in Geneva. The defeated republicans who had fought the Free State's forces in the 1922–23 Civil War regarded the tricolour as the flag of the self-proclaimed Irish Republic, and condemned its appropriation by the new state, as expressed in the song "Take It Down From The Mast". The Executive Council's decision was a provisional one. A 1928 British document said:

In 1937, the tricolour's position as the national flag was formally confirmed by the new Constitution of Ireland.

Marine

The pre-independence Merchant Shipping Act 1894 was not repealed, and so the Free State's mercantile marine was technically required to fly the Red Ensign. The collier Glenageary may have been the first to arrive in a British port flying the tricolour on 8 December 1921 (two days after the treaty). This flag along with a model of the Glenageary is on display in the National Maritime Museum of Ireland. While some ships, such as the cross-channel ferries flew the red ensign, others sailed under the tricolour. Some masters of Irish ships were charged by the British Customs and fined by courts for flying an "improper ensign". The tricolour was flown by the fisheries patrol vessel Muirchú, precursor to the Irish Naval Service; Frank Carney alleged in the Dáil in 1930 that a trespassing French trawler had refused to surrender to because it did not recognise Muirchú'''s flag.

Irish-register ships could fly the Red Ensign until September 1939, after the outbreak of World War II, when a decree under the state of emergency was made, to ensure neutral Irish ships were not mistaken for British ships. Some ships flying the tricolour were nevertheless sunk by Germans. When the tricolour was hoisted over the passenger ferries in Holyhead their British crews went on strike. Five days later their owners transferred the ferries to the British register and the Red Ensign was restored. On the other hand, the Belfast to Liverpool ferry, British owned and British crewed, used the tricolour as a flag of convenience; so did the whalers of Christian Salvesen Shipping, to take advantage of the Irish whale quota.

The tricolour's marine status was formalised by the Merchant Shipping Act, 1947.Sections 2 and 14, Merchant Shipping Act, 1947 Irish Statute Book

Use in Northern Ireland

In 1921, Ireland was partitioned, with the unionist-dominated north-east becoming Northern Ireland, while later, in 1922, the remainder of Ireland left the United Kingdom of Great Britain and Ireland to form the Irish Free State. Northern Ireland continued to use the UK's Union Flag and created its Ulster Banner derivation of the flag of Ulster with a crown on top of a six-pointed star. Furthermore, for many years the tricolour was effectively banned in Northern Ireland under the Flags and Emblems (Display) Act (Northern Ireland) 1954 which empowered the police to remove any flag that could cause a breach of the peace but specified, rather controversially, that a Union Flag could never have such an effect. In 1964, the enforcement of this law by the Royal Ulster Constabulary at the behest of Ian Paisley, involving the removal of a single tricolour from the offices of Sinn Féin in Belfast, led to two days of rioting. The tricolour was immediately replaced, highlighting the difficulty of enforcing the law.

Despite its original symbolism, in Northern Ireland the tricolour, along with most other markers of either British or Irish identity, has come to be a symbol of division. The Ulster Unionist Party Government of Northern Ireland adopted the Ulster Banner (based on the flag of Ulster) in 1953. Thus it is this flag and the Union Flag that are flown by unionists and loyalists, while the tricolour is flown by nationalists and republicans. In Northern Ireland, each community uses its own flags, murals and other symbols to declare its allegiance and mark its territory, often in a manner that is deliberately provocative. Kerb-stones in unionist and loyalist areas are often painted red, white and blue, while in nationalist and republican areas kerb-stones may be painted green, white and orange, although this is a much less frequent occurrence. Elements of both communities fly "their" flag from chimneys, tall buildings and lamp-posts on roads.

Under the 1998 Good Friday or Belfast Agreement, it was recognised that flags continue to be a source of disagreement in Northern Ireland. The Agreement stated that:

Unionists argue that the recognition of the principle of consent in the Agreement – that Northern Ireland's constitutional status cannot change without a majority favouring it – by the signatories amounts to recognising that the Union Flag is the only legitimate official flag in Northern Ireland.Northern Ireland Assembly Official Report of Tuesday 6 June 2000 , Northern Ireland Assembly, 6 June 2000. Retrieved 14 June 2007. Nationalists maintain that the Agreement means that the use of the Union Flag for official purposes should be restricted, or that the tricolour should be flown alongside the UK's flag on government buildings. However the tricolour is never flown from official buildings, alone or alongside the UK's flag. A Sinn Féin Lord Mayor of Belfast, Alex Maskey, displayed both flags in his own offices causing some controversy.Should Belfast have its own flag?, BBC News Talking Point, 5 September 2002. Retrieved 14 June 2007.

Protocol
The Department of the Taoiseach has issued guidelines to assist persons in giving due respect to the national flag. Observance of the guidelines is a matter for each individual as there are no statutory requirements. It is expected, however, that the national flag will be treated at all times with appropriate respect by those who use it. The department has general responsibility in relation to the national flag and this is primarily concerned with the protocol for the flying of the flag. The Department's role, therefore, is an advisory one.

With respect to the display, placing and precedence of the national flag by both itself and in relation to other flags, the department has made a number of suggestions. No flag or pennant should be flown above the national flag. When the flag is carried with another flag, or flags, it should be carried in the place of honour – that is on the marching right, or on the left of an observer towards whom the flags are approaching. Where one of these flags is that of the European Union, the European Union flag should be carried on the immediate left of the national flag, or, as seen by an observer when the flags are approaching, on the immediate right of the national flag. In the event of a display of crossed staffs, the national flag should be to the right and to the fore – that is to the left of the observer who is facing the flag. Its staff should be in front of the other flag or flags.

When the group of flags of the European Union are flown, the sequence is alphabetical, based on the first letter of the country's name. The flags should be flown from left to right with the European Union flag flown from the first flagstaff before the group. An alternative order of flags is to begin on the left with the national flag and place the European Union flag on the far right of the group, as seen by an observer. With regard to international flags; where either an even or an odd number of flags are flown in line on staffs of equal height, the national flag should be first on the right of the line – that is on the observer's left as he or she faces the flags. Where one of these flags is that of the European Union, the European Union flag should be flown on the immediate left of the national flag, or as seen by an observer, on the immediate right of the national flag. Where, however, an odd number of flags are displayed from staffs grouped so that there is one staff in the centre and higher than the others, the national flag should be displayed from the staff so placed. Where one of these flags is that of the European Union, the European Union flag should be flown from the first flagstaff on the right, or as seen by an observer, on the first flagstaff on the left. Only one national flag should be displayed in each group of flags or at each location. In all cases, the national flag should be in the place of honour. When the national flag is displayed either horizontally or vertically against a wall or other background, the green should be on the right (an observer's left) in the horizontal position or uppermost in the vertical position. When displayed on a platform, the national flag should be above and behind the speaker's desk. While being carried, the flag should not be dipped by way of salute or compliment except to the dead during memorial ceremonies.

In raising or lowering, the national flag should not be allowed to touch the ground. When being hoisted to half-mast, the flag should first be brought to the peak of the staff and then lowered to the half-mast position. It should again be brought to the peak of the staff before it is finally lowered. On ceremonial occasions when the national flag is being hoisted or lowered, or when it is passing by in a parade, all present should face it, stand to attention and salute. Persons in uniform who normally salute with the hand should give the hand salute. Persons in civilian attire should salute by standing to attention. The salute to the flag when it is being borne past in a parade is rendered when the flag is six paces away and the salute is held until the flag has passed by. Where more than one national flag is carried, the salute should be given only to the leading flag. When the national anthem is played in the presence of the national flag, all present should face the national flag, stand to attention and salute it, remaining at the salute until the last note of the music.

When the national flag has become worn or frayed it is no longer fit for display, and should not be used in any manner implying disrespect. The national flag, when used as a decoration, should always be treated with due respect. It may be used as a discreet lapel button or rosette or as part of a centrepiece for a table. When used in the latter context with the flags of other nations, the national flag should also be displayed in the place of honour on a nearby flag staff. Where multiple national flags are flown on festive occasions these should be of uniform dimensions. Bunting of the national colours may also be used on festive occasions.

The national flag should be displayed in the open only between sunrise and sunset, except on the occasion of public meetings, processions, or funerals, when it may be displayed for the duration of such functions.For military purposes, sunrise occurs at 8:00 a.m. between March and October, and at 8:30 a.m. between November and February. Sunset is deemed to occur at: 3:30 p.m. in January and December; 4:30 p.m. in February and November; 5:30 p.m. in March and October; 6:00 p.m. in April; 7:00 p.m. in May and September; and 8:00 p.m. between June and August. When displayed on a platform, the national flag should not be used to cover the speaker's desk, nor should it be draped over the platform. The national flag should never be defaced by placing slogans, logos, lettering or pictures of any kind on it, for example at sporting events. The flag should not be draped on cars, trains, boats or other modes of transport; it should not be carried flat, but should always be carried aloft and free, except when used to drape a coffin; on such an occasion, the green should be at the head of the coffin. The tricolour is draped across the coffins of Presidents of Ireland (including former presidents), soldiers and Garda Síochána personnel killed in the line of duty, and other notables accorded state funerals, such as Roger Casement in 1965, or Kevin Barry in 2001. Care should be taken at all times to ensure that the national flag does not touch the ground, trail in water or become entangled in trees or other obstacles.
It is the normal practice to fly the national flag daily at all military posts and from a limited number of important State buildings. The European flag is flown alongside the national flag on all official buildings, and in most places where the Irish flag is flown over buildings. The national flag is flown over buildings including: the residence of the President of Ireland, Áras an Uachtaráin; Leinster House, the seat of the Irish parliament, when parliament is in session; Irish courts and state buildings; Irish military installations, at home and abroad; Irish embassies and consulates; and Garda Síochána'' (police) stations. The national flag is also flown on Saint Patrick's Day (the national holiday), Easter Sunday and Easter Monday (in commemoration of the Easter Rising of 1916), and the National Day of Commemoration on the Sunday closest to 11 July. On these occasions the national flag is flown from all State buildings throughout the country which are equipped with flagpoles, and many private individuals and concerns also fly it. The national flag is flown on the occasion of other significant national and local events such as festivals and commemorations. The national flag is frequently flown at half-mast on the death of a national or international figure on all prominent government buildings equipped with a flag pole. The death of a prominent local figure may be marked locally by the national flag being flown at half-mast. Where the national flag is flown at half-mast no other flag should be half-masted.

Similar flags

The Flag of Ivory Coast has a similar colour layout to the Irish one, but with the orange on the hoist side and a shorter proportion (2:3 instead of 1:2). When Murielle Ahouré celebrated winning the 2018 world indoor 60-metre dash, she borrowed an Irish flag from a spectator and reversed it. Due to this similarity, in Northern Ireland, Ulster loyalists have sometimes desecrated the Ivorian flag, mistaking it for the Irish one. In 2014, Linfield F.C.'s shop on the predominantly-loyalist Shankill Road attracted media coverage, after a window display marking the World Cup included a sign clarifying that one of the flags on display was an Ivory Coast flag, not an Irish one. A Dublin pub also mistakenly flew the Ivorian flag in 2016.

See also

 Coat of arms of Ireland
 Cross-border flag for Ireland
 List of flags of Ireland
 Flag of Northern Ireland

References

External links

The National Flag - Irish government paper containing history and usage guidelines (archived)

National symbols of the Republic of Ireland
Ireland, Republic of
 
Ireland
1922 establishments in Ireland